One was the debut and sole album released by the supergroup The Panic Channel, who formed in 2004, released via Capitol Records on August 15, 2006. There were two singles released:  "Why Cry" and "Teahouse of the Spirits."

Track listing
 "Teahouse of the Spirits"  – 3:18
 "Left to Lose"  – 3:55
 "Bloody Mary"  – 4:07
 "Why Cry"  – 3:24
 "Awake"  – 3:48
 "She Won't Last"  – 4:46
 "Said You'd Be"  – 2:34
 "Outsider"  – 4:45
 "Blue Bruises"  – 3:56
 "Night One (from Planchette)"  – 7:58
 "Listen"  – 5:30
 "Lie Next to Me"  – 3:44
 "Untitled" – 1:21

Personnel 

Dave Navarro – lead guitar, backing vocals
Steve Isaacs – lead vocals, rhythm guitar, logo design
Chris Chaney – bass guitar
Stephen Perkins – drums
Josh Abraham – producer
Ted Jensen – mastering
Ron Laffitte – A&R
Chris Lord-Alge – mixing
Jimmy Turrell – art direction
Brian Virtue – producer, engineer
Ryan Williams – producer, engineer, mixing

References 

2006 debut albums
Albums produced by Josh Abraham
Capitol Records albums
The Panic Channel albums